Vollrathsruhe is a municipality  in the Mecklenburgische Seenplatte district, in Mecklenburg-Vorpommern, Germany.

Sights 
 Village Church, Kirch Grubenhagen.
 Vollrathsruhe Estate with two-storey, 13-wing country house, park and mausoleum 
 Dat lange Hus in Hallalit is of architectural interest: at 104 metres long, it is the longest fieldstone house in the region. This cottage was built in the mid-19th century for 16 families.
 Ruins of the 13th-century Grubenhagen Castle in Vollrathsruhe
 Protected central avant-corps of a building in Kirch Grubenhagen, Teterower Str. 3
 Schloss Grubenhagen country house and park 
 Hellgrund Nature Reserve,  Klein Rehberg and 
 Wüste und Glase Nature Reserve in Klein Luckow with a Bronze Age/Slavic burgwall.

Gallery

References